Paraphyllina ransoni is a species of crown jellyfish within the family Paraphyllinidae. It is found distributed in the Pacific and Atlantic Ocean near the United States, Canada and Liberia, aswell as in the Mediterranean Sea in deep pelagic waters. The bell reaches up to 75 millimeters wide, and is dome shaped with a thick mesoglea. Colorations are colourless with a redish stomach, although some individuals are brownish red all over.

References 

Animals described in 1956
Coronatae
Fauna of the Pacific Ocean
Fauna of the Atlantic Ocean
Fauna of the Mediterranean Sea